The Canadian U18 Curling Championships is an annual curling tournament held to determine the best juvenile-level curling team in Canada. Juvenile level curlers must be under the age of 18 as of June 30 in the year prior to the tournament.

The 2017 Canadian U18 Curling Championships was the inaugural championship for both the men's and women's sides. The event is a continuation of the Optimist U18 International Curling Championships. The U18 Internationals consisted of teams from Canada, USA, and Japan, and ran from 2001 to 2016 on both the men's and women's sides.

Champions

Boys

Girls

All-time medals
As of 2023

Provincial and territorial playdowns
 U18 New Brunswick Curling Championships
 U18 Ontario Curling Championships

References

External links
Curl Moncton website
https://web.archive.org/web/20180321130558/https://www.curlbc.ca/teams-ballard-cotter-claim-optimist-bc-u18-championships/

Canadian U18 Curling Championships
Curling competitions in Canada
Youth curling
Annual sporting events in Canada
Youth sport in Canada
National youth sports competitions